Algarrobo is a town and municipality of the Magdalena Department in northern Colombia. Founded in 1895 by José Felipe Oñate. Erected municipality by ordinance 008 of June 24, 1999.

Politics

Sub divisions 

The municipality of Algarrobo has three corregimientos:

Bella vista
Loma del Bálsamo
Estación Lleras

References

External links 

 *Gobernacion del Magdalena: Municipios -  Algarrobo

Municipalities of Magdalena Department